The Pillar New Testament Commentary (or PNTC) is a series of commentaries in English on the New Testament. It is published by the William B. Eerdmans Publishing Company.

Expanding during the last twenty years and already being revised this series seems designed for students and pastors. Exegetical opinions are addressed and current academic theories are reviewed making the series serious but not overly technical. The series is conservative evangelical, however its commentators hail from various churchmanship. Currently the series editor is D. A. Carson.

In August 2016, Eerdmans withdrew the two commentaries which Peter O'Brien has contributed to the series (on Ephesians and Hebrews) on account of plagiarism. According to Eerdmans, the commentary on Hebrews in particular ran afoul "of commonly accepted standards with regard to the utilization and documentation of secondary sources."

Reviews

Titles
 Pages 798
 Pages 578
 Pages
 Pages 715
 Pages 848
 Pages 669
 replaced  Pages 590
 Pages 960
 Pages 569
withdrawn  Pages 569
 Pages 392
 Pages 480
 Pages 440
. Pages 640
withdrawn  Pages 600
 Pages 287
 Pages 348
 Pages 277
 retired  Pages 272

See also 
 New International Commentary on the New Testament
 Exegesis

References

External links 
 The Pillar New Testament Commentary — official page of series at publisher's site.

Biblical commentaries